USS Herman S. Caswell (SP-2311), was a United States Navy patrol vessel in service from 1918 to 1919.

Herman S. Caswell was built as a civilian passenger yacht or ferry of the same name in 1878 at Noank, Connecticut. On 8 October 1918, the U.S. Navy chartered her from her owner, New York Sightseeing Yachts, for use as a section patrol boat during World War I. She was placed in service as USS Herman S. Caswell (SP-2311).

Assigned to the 3rd Naval District, Herman S. Caswell served on patrol and harbor duties until returned to New York Sightseeing Yachts on 7 March 1919.

References
 
 SP-2311: Herman S. Caswell at Department of the Navy Naval History and Heritage Command Online Library of Selected Images: U.S. Navy Ships -- Listed by Hull Number: "SP" #s and "ID" #s -- World War I Era Patrol Vessels and other Acquired Ships and Craft numbered from ID # 2300 through ID # 2399
 NavSource Online: Section Patrol Craft Photo Archive Herman S. Caswell (SP 2311)

Patrol vessels of the United States Navy
World War I patrol vessels of the United States
Ships built in Groton, Connecticut
1878 ships
Individual yachts